Igreja Metodista Unida is one of the largest Protestant denominations in Mozambique. It is a Methodist church. 

The church lost about 40% of its members from 1975 to 1980.

Churches in Mozambique
Methodist denominations